Jovan Radulović (29 September 1951 – 7 March 2018) was a Serbian writer and former director of the Belgrade City Library. His writing primarily deals with life and history of Serbs of Croatia. Several works authored by Radulović have been turned into films by Zdravko Šotra.

Works 

Ilinštak, short story collection
Golubnjača, short story collection
Dalje od oltara, short story collection
Idealan plac, short story collection
Mama vrana, tata vrana i deca vrane, short story collection
Vučari Donje i Gornje Polače, TV drama
Braća po materi, novel
Od Ognjene do Blage Marije, novel
Prošao život, novel
Golubnjača, drama
Učitelj Dositej, drama
Po srpskoj Dalmaciji, essays
Zrna iz pleve, essays
Uroniti u maticu života, short story collection
Sumnjiva sahrana, short story collection
U Islamu Grčkom, short story collection
Zamka za zeca, children literature
Stare i nove priče, short story collection
Nema Veronike i druge priče, short story collection
Bora pod okupacijom, drama
Slučaj Golubnjača - za i protiv, documents
Izabrane pripovijetke, short story collection
Najlepše pripovetke Jovana Radulovića, short story collection
Glava šećera, screenplay, (1990)
Svirač, screenplay, (1998)
Stari vruskavac, screenplay, (2000)

External links

References 

1951 births
2018 deaths
People from Knin
Serbs of Croatia
Serbian writers
University of Belgrade Faculty of Philology alumni
Burials at Belgrade New Cemetery